The Theatre Royal, Gravesend was a theatre established in the 1800s in Gravesend, Kent.

The theatre was established by the impresario Thomas Trotter as one of a number of provincial theatres in South East England. It opened in 1807.

References

1907 establishments in England
Theatres in Kent
Gravesend, Kent